David Hutchison MacGregor (1877, Monifieth, Angus, Scotland – 8 May 1953, Oxford, England) was a Scottish economist and Drummond Professor of Political Economy at the University of Oxford and Fellow of  All Souls, Oxford, from 1921 to 1945.

Early life
He was born in Monifieth in Angus, the third child of the Rev Robert MacGregor (1841-1915) minister of the Free Church of Scotland, and his wife, Lillias Hannah Hutchison (1842-1920).

MacGregor was educated at George Watson's College, Edinburgh and graduated with first class honours in philosophy from the University of Edinburgh in 1898. He then studied for a further degree in economics at Trinity College, Cambridge under Alfred Marshall; he gained a BA in 1901 and was elected President of the Cambridge Union the following year. In 1904 he was elected a Fellow of Trinity.

Career 
From 1908 to 1915 MacGregor was Professor of Economic and Political Science at the University of Leeds. In the First World War from 1915 to 1918, he served in the Royal Engineers in France and Italy, and was awarded the Military Cross for conspicuous gallantry.

In 1919 he became the Stanley Jevons Professor of Political Economy at Manchester and from 1921 to 1945 was Drummond Professor of Political Economy at Oxford.

Death 
He was killed after being hit by a vehicle in Oxford on 8 May 1953.

Works

Industrial Combinations (1906).
The Evolution of Industry (1911).
Enterprise Purpose and Profit: Essays on Industry (1934).
Public Aspects of Finance (1939).
Economic Thought and Policy (1949).

Notes

1877 births
1953 deaths
People educated at George Watson's College
Scottish economists
Alumni of the University of Edinburgh
Alumni of Trinity College, Cambridge
Presidents of the Cambridge Union
Fellows of Trinity College, Cambridge
Academics of the University of Leeds
Academics of the University of Manchester
Drummond Professors of Political Economy
Fellows of All Souls College, Oxford
People from Angus, Scotland